This article was split from List of museums in Texas.

 
The list of museums in Texas encompasses museums defined for this context as institutions (including nonprofit organizations, government entities, and private businesses) that collect and care for objects of cultural, artistic, scientific, or historical interest and make their collections or related exhibits available for public viewing.  Museums that exist only in cyberspace (i.e., virtual museums) are not included.  Also included are non-profit art galleries and exhibit spaces.

East Texas
  
East Texas is a region in the U.S. state of Texas, that borders the entire Louisiana state line on the east, Arkansas on the northeast near Texarkana, and Oklahoma on the north. It includes all or parts of 49 counties and contains the regions known as the Texas Piney Woods, and Deep East Texas.

Counties included are Anderson, Angelina, Bowie, Camp, Cass, Cherokee, Delta, Franklin, Gregg, Hardin, Harrison, Henderson, Hopkins, Houston, Jasper, Jefferson, Lamar, Marion, Morris, Nacogdoches, Newton, Orange, Panola, Polk, Rains, Red River, Rusk, Sabine, San Augustine, San Jacinto, Shelby, Smith, Titus, Trinity, Tyler, Upshur, Van Zandt, Walker and Wood.

Museums

Defunct museums
 Light Crust Doughboys Hall of Fame and Museum, Quitman, all things related to the Light Crust Doughboys, opened 2005, closed 2011

See also

 List of museums in Texas
 List of museums in Central Texas
 List of museums in the Texas Gulf Coast
 List of museums in North Texas
 List of museums in the Texas Panhandle
 List of museums in South Texas
 List of museums in West Texas

Resources
Texas Association of Museums
Historic House Museums in Texas

References

Lists of museums in Texas